The Ruby Jubilee Award is one of the annual awards given at the Kerala Film Critics Association Awards. It was constituted in 2016 to commemorate the 40th year of the award and is given to honour overall contributions to Malayalam cinema.

Winners

See also
 Chalachitra Ratnam Award
 Chalachitra Prathibha Award

References

Kerala Film Critics Association Awards